Panepistimio (literally University) is an under-construction metro station serving Thessaloniki Metro's Line 1 and Line 2. The station is named after the Aristotle University of Thessaloniki; it also serves the University of Macedonia. Construction of the station has been delayed by major archaeological finds, and it is designated as a mid-importance archaeological site by Attiko Metro, the company overseeing its construction. It is expected to enter service in 2023.
Panepistimio station appears in the 1988 Thessaloniki Metro proposal, and construction of a  section of the system began here in the same year before being abandoned due to lack of funding.

References

See also
List of Thessaloniki Metro stations

Thessaloniki Metro
Railway stations at university and college campuses